Ferrán Monzó Giménez (born 6 December 1992) is a Spanish footballer who plays for CD Dénia as a central defender.

Club career
Born in L'Alcúdia, Valencian Community, Monzó played amateur football until 2012 when he joined RCD Espanyol. He was assigned to the B-team, going on to spend two full seasons in Segunda División B with the side.

On 30 May 2014, Monzó was released, signing two months later with Doxa Katokopias F.C. of Cyprus. On 13 August 2015, he joined Romanian club FC Rapid București on a one-year contract.

References

External links
 
 

1992 births
Living people
People from Ribera Alta (comarca)
Sportspeople from the Province of Valencia
Spanish footballers
Footballers from the Valencian Community
Association football defenders
Segunda División B players
Tercera División players
RCD Espanyol B footballers
Getafe CF B players
Cypriot First Division players
Doxa Katokopias FC players
Liga I players
Liga II players
FC Rapid București players
ASA 2013 Târgu Mureș players
Spanish expatriate footballers
Expatriate footballers in Cyprus
Expatriate footballers in Romania
Spanish expatriate sportspeople in Romania